Sven Scheuer (born 19 January 1971) is a German former professional footballer who played as a goalkeeper.

Club career
Scheuer was born in Böblingen. He joined FC Bayern Munich in 1988, and spent 11 years with the club, serving as backup goalkeeper to Raimond Aumann until 1994 and later Oliver Kahn. He usually shared this role with another 'keeper, including Uwe Gospodarek (1991–1994), Michael Probst (1994–1996) and Bernd Dreher (1996–1999). He made 20 appearances in the Bundesliga, half of which came in the 1994–95 season, and won five league titles, plus the UEFA Cup in 1996 and the DFB Pokal in 1998. He also played regularly for Bayern's reserve team, in the Oberliga Bayern and Regionalliga Süd.

After leaving Bayern, Scheuer embarked on a fairly nomadic career, playing for Adanaspor in Turkey, Grazer AK in Austria, and 1. FC Saarbrücken and VfL Osnabrück back home. He also had an unsuccessful trial with Crystal Palace in 2002.

International career
Scheuer played one match for the Germany under-21 national team, a 3–0 win over Luxembourg in October 1990.

Honours
Bayern Munich
 Bundesliga: 1988–89, 1989–90, 1993–94, 1996–97, 1998–99
 UEFA Cup: 1995–96
 DFB-Pokal: 1997–98
 UEFA Champions League: runner-up 1998–99
 DFB-Ligapokal: 1997, 1998

References

1971 births
Living people
People from Böblingen
Sportspeople from Stuttgart (region)
Association football goalkeepers
German footballers
Germany under-21 international footballers
German expatriate footballers
Bundesliga players
FC Bayern Munich footballers
FC Bayern Munich II players
1. FC Saarbrücken players
VfL Osnabrück players
Grazer AK players
Adanaspor footballers
Süper Lig players
Austrian Football Bundesliga players
Expatriate footballers in Turkey
Expatriate footballers in Austria
Footballers from Baden-Württemberg
West German footballers
German expatriate sportspeople in Turkey
German expatriate sportspeople in Austria